Peeter Oja (born 2 July 1960 in Tallinn) is an Estonian actor, singer, comedian and media personality.

In 1986 he graduated from the Tallinn State Conservatory Stage Art Department. 1986-1989 he worked at Vanemuine Theatre. 1992-1994 he worked at Estonia Theatre. Since 1994 he is a freelance actor.

He has been a member of several musical groups, including Kuldne Trio and Bläck Rokit.

He has hosted several popular television series, e.g. Kitsas king (1985–1987), the comedy ensemble Kreisiraadio (1997–2003), with whom he appeared as Estonia's entry with at the Eurovision Song Contest 2008, and Ärapanija (2003–2013). Oja has also appeared in a number of prominent roles in feature films.

References

Living people
1960 births
Estonian comedians
Estonian male stage actors
Estonian male film actors
Estonian male television actors
Estonian male voice actors
20th-century Estonian male actors
21st-century Estonian male actors
20th-century Estonian male singers
Eurovision Song Contest entrants for Estonia
Estonian Academy of Music and Theatre alumni
Male actors from Tallinn
Eurovision Song Contest entrants of 2008